Karolis Laukžemis (born 11 March 1992) is a Lithuanian professional footballer who plays as a striker for Lithuania national team.

Career
Born in Palanga, Lithuania he has played club football for FK Atlantas, FK Klaipėdos Granitas, FK Sūduva Marijampolė and FK Jelgava.
In 2017 he was one of the main figures to help FK Suduva Marijampole to win their first championship ever. He was awarded as best player of A lyga in that season.
On 26 October 2020, Laukžemis moved to Maltese club Hibernians on a one-year deal.

On 2 September 2022 Sūduva announced about deal with Laukžemis till the end of the A Lyga 2023 season.

International career 
Laukžemis made his international debut for the Lithuania in 2018.

International stats

International goals
Scores and results list Lithuania's goal tally first.

Honours
Atlantas
A Lyga runner-up: 2013

Sūduva
A Lyga: 2017
Lithuanian Cup runner-up: 2016
Lithuanian Supercup: 2018

Jelgava
Virslīga runner-up: 2016

Individual
 A Lyga Player of the Year: 2017
 A Lyga Player of the Month: March 2018

References

External links

Karolis Laukžemis at Lietuvos Futbolas

1992 births
Living people
Sportspeople from Palanga
Lithuanian footballers
Lithuanian expatriate footballers
Lithuania international footballers
FK Atlantas players
FK Palanga players
FK Minija Kretinga players
FK Klaipėdos Granitas players
FK Sūduva Marijampolė players
FK Jelgava players
NK Istra 1961 players
Hibernians F.C. players
A Lyga players
Latvian Higher League players
Croatian Football League players
Maltese Premier League players
Slovenian PrvaLiga players
Association football forwards
Expatriate footballers in Latvia
Expatriate footballers in Croatia
Expatriate footballers in Slovenia
Expatriate footballers in Malta
Lithuanian expatriate sportspeople in Latvia
Lithuanian expatriate sportspeople in Croatia
Lithuanian expatriate sportspeople in Slovenia
Lithuanian expatriate sportspeople in Malta